Kaşif Nevzat Tarhan (born July 7, 1952) is a Turkish psychiatrist and Psychological warfare expert  and neuropsychology expert.

Life
He was born in Merzifon in 1952. He finished Kuleli Military High School in 1969 and graduated from Cerrahpaşa Medical School Istanbul University in 1975. Following his internship at GATA (Gülhane Military Medical Academy) he worked in Cyprus and Bursa garrisons at different military medical institutions. In 1982 he became a specialist psychiatrist at GATA. After his clinical services as a specialist at Erzincan and Çorlu Hospitals, he became an assistant professor(1988), an associate professor (1990) at GATA Haydarpaşa. He was promoted to colonel in 1993 and became a professor in 1996. Between 1996 – 1999 he worked at  Yüzüncü Yıl University as faculty member and as an expert at Forensic Institution. He got retired on his own will. He took the representation of  "Memory Centers of America" in Turkey in 1998.

Turkish mob boss Sedat Peker claimed Nevzat Tarhan is a Psychological warfare consultant to SADAT

He has been the chairman of the board of NPİSTANBUL, the first neuropsychiatry hospital of Turkey, and also the founding rector of Üsküdar University.

He has more than a hundred publications 31 of which are international. He speaks English and German. He is married and has two children.

Social responsibility projects
İDER Human Values and Mental Health Foundation, Chairman
ASDER (Human rights organization) Defenders of Justice Association, Chairman
Happy Home Happy Life Association, Chairman (Focusing on orphans and deprived children)
Come Hold My Hand Association, Chairman (Child abuse and negligence)

Congress and magazines                           
1989: "Stress and Diseases"
1991: "Innovations in Psychopharmacology"
1992: "Aggression"
1993: "Serotonin"

He took part in the organization committee of 7th International ECNS Congress which was held in İstanbul in 2007.

Awards
"Best Research and Best Researcher" in International Congress on "Destructive Drives and Impulse Control", Netherlands, 1991.
"RTGD Best Community Program" for television program called "Reasonable Solutions" in TV, 2003
"Supporting family training and protective community mental health services" with Psikoyorum TV program on Sky Turk 360 from Prime Ministry General Directorate of Family and Social Research, 2005.
"Golden Apple" award by Amasya Foundation for his contribution to the use of Turkish Music in  music therapy, 2007.
"Crystal Tulip" award on Psychology category by Mümtaz Turhan Social Sciences High School of Istanbul 2009.
"Patient Safety, Best Practice " award by OHSAD and Patient Safety Foundation, 2009
"Award of Istanbul Congress Ambassador/2011"  7th ECNS "EEG and Clinical Neuroscience" Congress for organizing ECNS Congress in İstanbul, and making it possible for many world-famous scientists to come together.
 “From Universal Fellowship to World Peace Invitation Award” in Science and Research branch by World Fellowship Union Mevlana Supreme Foundation Universal, 2017.
 “Social Responsibility Award in Health” in 2017 by Health Volunteers Turkey and Hospital Manager Magazine due to his genuine contributions in health system.
 Awarded Golden Axon Leadership Award by SBMT in 2019.
 APA 2020 virtual Conference / Course of The Month of 2020-Computational Psychiatry & Future Perspectives, (APA), 2020.

Membership in scholarly institutions
American Psychiatric Association (APA), Member
New York Academy of Sciences, Member
New York Academia Psychiatry Foundation, Member
International Psychogeriatric Association (IPA), Member
EEG and Clinical Neuroscience Society (ECNS), Member of Executive Board
International Society for Neuroimaging in Psychiatry (ISNIP), Member
Anxiety Disorders Association of America (ADAA),
National Geografic Society, Member
International Society for Neurofeedback & Research (ISNR), Member
Society for Brain Mapping and Therapeutics, Member of the Board 
Turkish Society for Brain Mapping and Therapeutics (TSBMT),  President
Turkish American Neuropsychiatric Association (TANPA), President

Published books
A Preliminary Study of Seed Based Functional Connectivity Analysis for Classification of MDD and Healthy Subjects Using Graph Metrics, (book section) 2019
Family Therapy with Mawlana, 2019
Conscious Youth, 2019
Conscious Family, 2019
Faith in the Laboratory, 2018
Mom, what is a coup? (2017)
Being a Conscious Family (2014)
Love Therapy (2014)
Yunus Therapy (2014)
Positive Psychology, Co-authored (Orhan GÜMÜŞEL, Aynur SAYIM) Epsilon Publishing, 2008, İstanbul
The Masnavi Therapy, Timas Publishing Group  İstanbul 2012
You Me and Our Kids, Timas Publishing Group 2012 İstanbul
Bediuzzaman the conscience of the epoch, Nesil Yay. 2012 İstanbul
A Model of Mature Man, Timas Publishing Group 2011, İstanbul
Is there any one wanting to understand me? Timas Publishing Group. 2009, İstanbul.
Of Life, Co-authored (Dr. Elif Ilgaz) Epsilon Publishing, 2008, İstanbul
Family, The Last Refuge, Timas Publishing Group 2002. İstanbul.
Psychology of Faith, Human Beings in the triangle of Sprit, Brain and Mind, Timas Publishing Group 2009. İstanbul
Addiction, Timas Publishing Group 2002. İstanbul.
Social Psychology; From Social Schizophrenia to Social Empathy Timas Publishing Group 2010, İstanbul.
Psychological Warfare (Gray Propaganda), Timas Publishing Group 2002. İstanbul
A Journey from Mind to Heart, Bediüzzaman Way, Nesil Yay. İstanbul 2012
Woman Psychology, Nesil Publishing Group, 2005, İstanbul.
Psychology of Happiness, Converting stress into happiness, Timas Publishing Group 2002, İstanbul.
Reasonable Solution, A Guide for intra-family communication, Timas Publishing Group 2004, İstanbul.
To be at peace with yourself. Zafer Yay. 2001. İstanbul.
Psychology of Emotions, Timas Publishing Group 2006. İstanbul.
Psychology of Marriage, Timas Publishing Group 2006. İstanbul
Family School, Timas Publishing Group 2004.İstanbul
Asymmetric War, Political psychology, Timas Publishing Group 2010, İstanbul.
Innovations in Psychopharmacology, the Symposium Book. GATA 1991, Istanbul.
Biological, Sociological, Psychological Aspects of Violence (co-authored), Yücel Yay. 2000. İstanbul.
Stress and Diseases. Gri Ajans, 1990. İstanbul.
Blood and Circulation (1982)

References

External links
 
 

1952 births
Living people
People from Merzifon
Turkish medical researchers
Turkish psychiatrists
Memory researchers
Neuropsychologists
Istanbul University Cerrahpaşa Faculty of Medicine alumni